The Czechoslovakia men's national under-18 ice hockey team was the men's under-18 ice hockey team that represented Czechoslovakia at international competitions. It was succeeded by the Czech Republic men's national under-18 ice hockey team in 1993.

The team won a total of 22 medals at the IIHF European Junior Championships, including five gold, nine silver, and eight bronze medals. They finished in 4th place at the unofficial 1967 European U19 Championship.

International competitions

IIHF European U18/U19 Championships
 

1967 (unofficial): 4th place
1968:  1st place
1969:  3rd place
1970:  2nd place
1971:  3rd place
1972:  3rd place
1973:  3rd place
1974: 4th place
1975:  2nd place
1976: 4th place
1977:  2nd place
1978: 4th place
1979:  1st place

1980:  2nd place
1981:  2nd place
1982:  2nd place
1983:  3rd place
1984:  2nd place
1985:  3rd place
1986:  3rd place
1987:  2nd place
1988:  1st place
1989:  2nd place
1990:  3rd place
1991:  1st place
1992:  1st place

References

National under-18 ice hockey teams
Former national ice hockey teams
Under-18